Ille Christine Gebeshuber (born 10 April 1969 in Bruck an der Mur, Styria) is an Austrian physicist who is specialized in nanophysics and biomimetics.

Biography
Ille Gebeshuber studied at the Vienna University of Technology, where she continued to work as a key researcher and lecturer. From 2009 until 2015 she was a professor at the Institute of Microengineering and Nanoelectronics (IMEN) at the National University of Malaysia (UKM). Since 2016 she is back at her home institution, the Vienna University of Technology, at the Institute of Applied Physics. Her book "Wo die Maschinen wachsen: Wie Lösungen aus dem Dschungel unser Leben verändern werden" (Where the machines grow: How solutions from the jungle will change our lives) was shortlisted as Austrian Science Book of the Year 2017.

2017 she was elected 'Austrian of the Year' in the category 'Research'.

References

External links
 Webseite at Vienna University of Technology
 Ille Gebeshuber's Homepage
 Ille Gebeshuber's TEDx KL Talk
 'Where the Machines grow' Science Book (2016) in German by Ille Gebeshuber (Austrian Science Book of the Year - Shortlist 2017 in the Category Science & Technology)
 'A brief History of the Future' Science Book (2020) in German by Ille Gebeshuber

1969 births
Living people
People from Bruck an der Mur
Austrian physicists
Nanotechnologists
Academic staff of the National University of Malaysia
TU Wien alumni
Academic staff of TU Wien